Rocoberry (Hangul: 로코베리) is a South Korean indie pop duo consisting of members Roco and Conan (also known as Berry). They are best known for composing songs for Korean dramas, including the 2017 hit song, "I Will Go to You like the First Snow," performed by Ailee for the Guardian: The Lonely and Great God soundtrack. They have also composed songs for the soundtracks to Descendants of the Sun and Moon Lovers: Scarlet Heart Ryeo, among others.

Discography

Singles

EP

Songwriting credits 

Below are Rocoberry's songwriting credits for songs performed by other artists. An asterisks (*) denotes that only Roco is credited. Two asterisks (**) denotes that only Conan is credited. All information is from the Korean Music Copyright Association.

References

21st-century South Korean male singers
South Korean  songwriters
Musical groups from Seoul
Indie pop groups